Kevin Müller (born 15 March 1991) is a German professional footballer who plays as a goalkeeper for 1. FC Heidenheim.

Career
For the 2013–14 season Müller moved to VfB Stuttgart II. On 10 June 2013, he signed a contract until June 2015 with VfB Stuttgart.

On 1 August 2014, Müller joined FC Energie Cottbus on loan. Simultaneously he extended his contract with Stuttgart until 2016. Cottbus hired him as a replacement for the injured regular goalkeeper René Renno.

For the 2015–16 season he moved to 1. FC Heidenheim.

References

External links
 
 

1991 births
Living people
Sportspeople from Rostock
German footballers
Germany youth international footballers
Association football goalkeepers
2. Bundesliga players
3. Liga players
FC Hansa Rostock players
VfB Stuttgart II players
FC Energie Cottbus players
Footballers from Mecklenburg-Western Pomerania